Ryan van Dijk (28 May 1990, Zevenaar) is a Dutch former professional footballer.

Van Dijk participated in the joined youth program of NEC Nijmegen and FC Oss. In July 2009 he moved to Young NEC Nijmegen. In season 2011/12 he transferred free to FC Oss. Next he played for Sportclub NEC, ASWH and VV Smitshoek.

References

1990 births
Living people
ASWH players
Association football midfielders
Dutch footballers
People from Zevenaar
Footballers from Gelderland
NEC Nijmegen players
TOP Oss players
21st-century Dutch people